Androcalva loxophylla is a species of flowering plant in the family Malvaceae and is endemic to northern Australia. It is a shrub with spreading or low-lying branches, oblong to broadly elliptic leaves and clusters of 4 to 20 yellow flowers.

Description
The edges of the leaves sometimes have rounded teeth, and both surfaces are covered with fine, star-shaped hairs, more densely so on the lower surface. There is a usually a single, yellow staminode between the stamens.

Taxonomy
This species was first formally described in 1859 by Ferdinand von Mueller who gave it the name Rulingia loxophylla in his Fragmenta Phytographiae Australiae.  In 2011, Carolyn Wilkins and Barbara Whitlock transferred the species to the genus Androcalva in Australian Systematic Botany. The specific epithet (loxophylla) means "cross-wise-leaved", referring to the slanting leaf base of this species.

Distribution and habitat
Androcalva loxophylla often grows in dense suckering colonies in sand and is found from Broome in the far north-west of Western Australia, through the Great Victoria, Gibson and Little Sandy Deserts to Innamincka in South Australia and through the Northern Territory to Windorah in western Queensland.

References

Malvales of Australia
Flora of Western Australia
Flora of the Northern Territory
Flora of South Australia
Flora of Queensland
Plants described in 1859
loxophylla
Taxa named by Ferdinand von Mueller